Mohd Redzuan Suhaidi (born 6 October 1995) is a Malaysian footballer who plays as a defensive midfielder for Malaysia M3 League club Langkawi City.

Career

Penang FA
Mohd Redzuan Suhaidi is a first team player for Penang FA squad in 2015.  In October 2015, Redzuan has been called up by coach Ong Kim Swee to face Palestine and UAE in 2018 World Cup Qualifiers but not play both games.

References

1995 births
Living people
Malaysian footballers
Penang F.C. players
People from Penang
Malaysian people of Malay descent
Association football midfielders